Clannad is an Irish folk and Celtic musical group.

Clannad may also refer to:
Clannad (album), an album by Clannad
Clannad 2, an album by Clannad
Clannad (video game), a Japanese visual novel
Clannad (film), a Japanese anime film based on the visual novel